Nicholas Teo is a Malaysian Chinese singer under Good Tengz Entertainment Sdn Bhd. (Malaysia)

Career

Pre debut
Before returning to Malaysia, Nicholas was studying in Taiwan, where he won the Best Singer in a competition among all the Taiwan universities. Thereafter, he was approached and asked if he would sign up with a company as a back-up singer (backing vocalist, to harmonise with the lead vocalist), which Nicholas subsequently ignored. He returned to Malaysia without finishing his studies and participated in the singing competition "2002 Astro Talent Quest". Nicholas won first place with the song 黃昏(Huáng Hūn), originally sung by Zhou Chuan Xiong. This led to Nicholas signing a contract in Taiwan with Music Street in 2003.

Debut

2004–2014
On 18 June 2004 he released his first album 首選張棟樑 (“1st Choice Nicholas”). Music Street eventually merged with Warner Music. Play Music is a record label subsidiary of Singaporean company Musicstreet Pte Ltd. In 2006, Nicholas received the 2006 Hito Newcomer Award in Taiwan. He also successfully completed his From Now On Concert Tour covering stops in Malaysia, Singapore and Indonesia within the first half-year of 2008. The Malaysian government appointed Teo Penang's 'green ambassador' to spread awareness on environmental issues.

2015-Present
On 7 August 2015, Nicholas came back from his "Long Vacation" after 8 months of continuous filming his idol dramas, "K Song Lover" and "Lady Maid Maid". As his management contract came to an end, he decided to have a short break from his work which he never had before. He went to New York for acting lessons for three months during his vacation. He released a new book, featuring his new mini album, "Long Vacation".

Discography

Albums

EP

OST
Smiling Pasta OST 微笑PASTA電視原聲帶 (2006)
 Invincible Shan Bao Mei OST (2008)

Filmography

Television series

Movies

Nominations 
 MTV Asia Awards – Favourite Artiste Malaysia (2008)
 2008 TVB8 Golden Chart Awards – Most Popular Male Singer, Gold Song (Xin Ge Shi Chang), Mainland's Most-Loved Male Singer
 2008 PWH Awards Malaysia
 2016 Global Chinese Awards in Beijing
 2018 AIM Chinese Awards Malaysia

Awards 

 TVB8 Best New Talent Artiste – Gold Award (2003)
 Global Chinese Music Award – Best Newcomer (2005)
 Singapore Hit Award – Best New Act (2005)
 HITO Newcomer Award (2006)
 Malaysia PWH Award (2006)
 Malaysia Didadee Hits Award – Most Popular Chinese Singer (2007)
 Red Box Karaoke Annual K-Songs Top 20 (2007)
 1st Kiss Apple Love Song Chart Award (2008)
 Malaysia Leaping Youth Most Yeah! Award (2008)
Readers' Favourite Hit Songs – "Prince" & "Try Singing a New Song" + Readers' Most-Loved Best Local Male Singer(Gold) 2008
 MTV Asia Favourite Artiste Malaysia Award (2008)
 現場投選最受歡迎原唱歌手獎 [娛協獎2008] (2008)
 2009 Annual Kiss Apple Top 10 Love Songs Chart – Winning Song "Ji Mo Na Me Duo" (Taiwan)
 2009 Metro Mandarin Power Awards – Most Improved Singer and Asia's Popular Idol (Hong Kong)
 2016 Global Melody Awards in Beijing Top 20 Songs of the Year - "There's No If" and "Most Recommended Malaysian Artiste"
 2016 Sept - Malaysia AIM Chinese Awards - 7 Awards archived in the awards.
 2018 May - Malaysia PWH Awards (Organised by Chinese Media) - The Most Recommended Singer of the year, the best song of the year & The best EP of the year.
 2020 Jan - Malaysia AIM Chinese Awards - The Best Productions of "The Best Is Yet To Come".

Trivia 
 Although he is Chinese-Malaysian, it is said that his smile looks like that of Korean star Kim Jaewon. He is often mistaken for him.
 Amber Kuo is one of the female actress/singer that works with him in the drama, Invincible Shan Bao Mei
 Cyndi Wang is one of the female actress/singer that works with him. She plays the leads in both his drama (Smiling Pasta, 2006) and animation film (Ratatouille, 2007) debuts.

 He is currently rumoured to be with Cyndi Wang, after the two surprisingly showed up at each other's autograph sessions. Cyndi Wang showed up at his latest album Prince Nicholas' press conference, presenting him a glass slipper, which he later helped her put on. He also showed up at Cyndi Wang's latest album Magic Cyndi's autograph session and presented her with a love amulet.
 Nicholas used to attend piano lessons when small as a result of encouragement from his supportive mother. Unfortunately, he gave up later. The thought of performing the instrument again occurred to him while planning special segments for his Fisherman's Pier Celebration Concert in Taiwan(2007). Although time constraint prevented such idea to come to fruition, Nicholas hoped that there will still be possible chances for him to do so in future.
 Fish Leong and Nicholas are very good friends as both hail from the same country, Malaysia, and have their careers currently based in Taiwan. They were rumoured to be together shortly before Nicholas' first major concert in Kuala Lumpur. Although he prefers to look up to her as his senior in the music industry, Nicholas does not completely dismiss the idea that their relationship can progress beyond that of friendship one day.
 During Smiling Pasta Promo, Cyndi Wang announce publicly that Nicholas is "skillful with his tongue" when kissing.
 Album name: Wangzi

Related artists/bands
 Cui Jian
 Dou Wei
 Tang Dynasty (band)

References

External links
 Nicholas Teo Album Lyrics

1981 births
Living people
Malaysian male actors
Malaysian people of Hokkien descent
Malaysian people of Chinese descent
Malaysian expatriates in Taiwan
Malaysian Mandopop singers
People from Sarawak
Warner Music Group artists